Mohammad Reza Jozi (born 1 August 1975, Isfahan) is an Iranian theatre actor and director, as well as a member of the Naqshineh Theatre group.

Acting credits
The Caucasian Chalk Circle (1998), by Bertolt Brecht, directed by Hamid Samandarian, Tehran.
Waiting for Godot (1998), by Samuel Beckett, directed by Vahid Rahbani, Tehran and Paris.
Richard III (1999), by William Shakespeare, directed by Davood Rashidi, Tehran.
Rhinoceros (2001), by Eugène Ionesco, directed by Vahid Rahbani, Tehran.
Poor Bitos (2002), by Jean Anouilh, directed by Hamid Mozaffari, Tehran.
Never Snows in Egypt (2004), by Mohammad Charmshir, directed by Ali Rafiee, Tehran.
Like Blood for Steak (2004), by Mohammad Charmshir, directed by Hassan Majooni, Tehran.
Vanek Trilogie (2005), by Václav Havel, directed by Sohrab Salimi, Tehran.
Julius Caesar, Told by a Nightmare, (2005), by Naghmeh Samini, directed by, Kioomars Moradi, Tehran.
The Invisible Cities (2005), by Akbar Alizad, directed by Hassan Majoni, Tehran.
Eleutheria (play) (2005), by Samuel Beckett, directed by Vahid Rahbani, and Mohammadreza Jouze Tehran.
The Windows (2005), written and directed by Farhad Ayish, Tehran.
Don Camillo (2006), written and directed by Kourosh Narimani, Tehran.
Oleanna (2006), by David Mamet and directed by Aliakbar Alizad, Tehran.
Lifes Drama (2006), by Babak Mohammadi, Tehran.
Death slow dream(2007), by Mohammad Charmshir and directed by Hassan Majooni, Tehran

Directing credits
Eleutheria (2005, with Vahid Rahbani).

External links
Biography, from Naqshineh Theatre

1975 births
Living people
20th-century Iranian male actors
Iranian male stage actors
21st-century Iranian male actors